Auguste Joseph-Marie François Le Guennant (10 January 1881 – 17 May 1972) was a French organist, church musician and composer. He was, after positions as organist and head of the chapel in Paris and Nantes, the director and teacher at the Gregorian Institute of Paris, as a specialist of Gregorian chant.

Biography 
Born in 1881 in Auray (Morbihan), Auguste Le Guennant was the son of Auguste Marie Le Guennant and his wife Valentine Joséphine Françoise le Duff. studied at the Schola Cantorum de Paris, the organ with Alexandre Guilmant and composition with Vincent d'Indy. He held for some time the position of organist at the grand organ of Notre-Dame de Clignancourt, and left Paris in 1905 to become head of the chapel at Notre-Dame-de-Bon-Port in Les Sables-d'Olonne, and from 1908 at the Basilica of Saint-Nicolas in Nantes. He founded the mixed group A Capella in this city, in collaboration with A. Mahot.

The Mutual Edition of the Schola Cantorum published his Adagietto for organ, and an O Salutaris for four mixed voices. Mr. Biton published an accompanying book on Gregorian chant.

In 1925, Le Guennant arrived at the Gregorian Institute of Paris as director and teacher of Gregorian chant, succeeding Dom Joseph Gajard of the Solesmes Abbey.
After the Second World War, he organized many Gregorian sessions, not only in France but also in Fátima, and even Rio de Janeiro. Still teaching at the Gregorian Institute in Paris, this pedagogue and musician considerably boosted the teaching of Gregorian chant, by creating centres of study in several countries. When Maurice Duruflé thought about basing his Requiem on Gregorian chant, he asked Le Guennant for advice, and gratefully acknowledged his understanding. In 1960, Duruflé dedicated a composition to Le Guennant, his Quatre Motets sur des thèmes grégoriens which were also based on chant.

In 1953, Le Guennant was awarded the Honorary Doctorate of the Pontifical Institute of Sacred Music in Rome.

Writings 
 1947: Notes pour servir à la direction d’une Schola Grégorienne.
 1948: Précis de rythmique grégorienne.
 1988: Vade Mecum Paroissial de l'Accompagnateur Grégorien (posthumous)

References

Bibliography

External links 
 
 Biographical Dictionary of the Organ: Auguste de le Guennant on organ-biography.info
 (Notre-Dame) Sonate No. 1 – Final Alexandre Guilmant Opus 42 on YouTube
 The Technique of Gregorian Chironomy (dedicated to Le Guennant) media.musicasacra.com

20th-century French composers
French classical organists
French male organists
1881 births
People from Auray
1972 deaths
Schola Cantorum de Paris alumni
20th-century organists
20th-century French male musicians
Male classical organists